Rydell Tyron Booker (born 17 February 1981) is an American professional boxer. He was the former number one ranked amateur Heavyweight in the United States.

Incarceration
Shortly after his first professional loss to James Toney, Booker was convicted for possession of cocaine with intent to deliver over 1000 grams. He was sentenced to 12 to 30 years in prison. After serving over a decade, Booker was released, and won three comeback bouts of six rounds duration, before losing a televised ten round bout by unanimous decision to undefeated heavyweight Jermaine Franklin in Atlantic City's Boardwalk Hall.

Amateur career
During his amateur career he won the Michigan State and Regional championships every year from 1992 through 2000, his first national title came in 1999. In 2001 he defeated Devin Vargas at the U.S. Challenge. As the top rated Heavyweight in the United States. Rydell was to represent the USA at the World Championship in Ireland. During Training at Lake Placid, New York, he was accused of stealing a calling card from fellow fighter Jason Estrada, and decided to leave the team training and turn pro instead.

Professional career
Much later in his professional career, while out of jail on bond and far from tip-top shape, he signed for an IBA world championship heavyweight bout with James Toney. Five months before, Booker had been arrested in Detroit with three other men and charged with possession of cocaine and intent to deliver more than 1,000 grams of the drug. On September 23, 2004 in Temecula, California, Rydell fought James Toney for the International Boxing Association heavyweight and WBC Continental Americas heavyweight championships. In the fight Booker was down in the eighth and then went on to lose the twelve-round decision.

Professional boxing record

References

External links
 

Boxers from Detroit
Heavyweight boxers
Cruiserweight boxers
1981 births
Living people
American male boxers